The Triathlon EDF Alpe d'Huez, named after its sponsor Électricité de France (EDF), was established in 2006 by World Triathlon Champion . It is not sanctioned by the International Triathlon Union (ITU) or Fédération Française de Triathlon (FFTRI). The long course event comprises a 2.2 km swim, a 115 km cycle and a 22 km run. It starts with the swim at the reservoir Lac du Verney then the cycling features the 21 bends used by the Tour de France as it climbs 1120 m to the ski resort of Alpe d'Huez for the run.

History
In 2009, the long distance triathlon attracted 671 sportsmen and sportswomen (516 finishers) and the short distance triathlon boasted 839 participants (749 finishers), 62 percent of them were French. In 2010 the start list reached a new record with 1150 short distance participants and 943 long distance participants on 15 July, i.e. two weeks before the triathlon.

Most of the Alpe d'Huez winners are international elite stars, especially on the long distance. In 2007 and in 2008 Chrissie Wellington placed first and in 2009 Nicola Spirig won gold.
On the short distance, four French triathletes could win the gold medal: Delphine Pelletier, Hervé Faubre, Bertrand Billard, and Frédéric Belaubre.
Charlotte Morel, the French U23 Champion of the years 2009 and 2010, placed first on the sprint distance in 2007. In 2008 she won the sprint triathlon in Vaujany and the courte distance (1200+30+7) triathlon in Alpe d'Huez in 2008. In the following years, however, she was dogged by misfortune: in 2009, starting as the natural favourite for the gold medal, she was involved in a bicycle crash right at the beginning, and in 2010 due to health problems she could not take part in the race.

Alpe d'Huez Triathlon Winners

Gallery

Notes

References

External links 
 Triathlon EDF Alpe d'Huez

Triathlon competitions in France